The 2012 Dalian Aerbin F.C. season is the third season in club history, and the first season in the Chinese Super League, promoted after finishing 1st in the 2011 China League One.

Overview
Before the season started, Aerbin signed Korean manager Chang Woe-Ryong for 3 years, hoping to improve the team with his counter attack tactics, but announced his resignation in April, and replaced him with Aleksandar Stanojević. The team ended 5th in the league, failed to enter AFC Champions League.

Players

Chinese Super League

League table

League fixtures and results

Chinese FA Cup

References

Dalian Professional F.C. seasons
Dalian Aerbin F.C.